Massachusetts Route 102 (MA 102) is a  west–east state highway in western Massachusetts. Its western terminus is at the New York border where it connects to New York State Route 22 (NY 22) in Canaan, New York, and its eastern terminus is at the intersection U.S. Route 20 (US 20) and the Massachusetts Turnpike (Interstate 90) exit 10 in Lee. Along the way it intersects several major highways, including Route 41 in West Stockbridge and US 7 and Route 183 in Stockbridge.

Route description

Route 102 begins in West Stockbridge at the New York state line. It continues into Canaan, New York to meet New York State Route 22 (NY 22) via a  connector road. The road, maintained by the New York State Department of Transportation, is designated NY 980D, an unsigned reference route.

The route crosses Interstate 90 (Massachusetts Turnpike) twice in its first , where it is also known as State Line Road. It joins Route 41 for a  concurrency through the center of West Stockbridge, crossing the Williams River south of Shaker Mill Pond. The concurrency ends just north of exit 3 of the Mass Pike, which provides access to the eastbound turnpike and from the westbound turnpike.

Following this intersection, the route continues east into Stockbridge as West Stockbridge Road. It crosses the Mass Pike once more before intersecting Route 183 – which serves the Berkshire Botanical Garden and Norman Rockwell Museum – in the Larrywaug section of town.

The route then continues eastward via Pleasant Street, traveling parallel to the Housatonic River as it continues into Lee. After an at-grade railroad crossing with the Berkshire Subdivision, the route turns to the northeast before meeting its eastern terminus at the junction of US 20 (Houstatonic Street) and the entrance ramps to exit 10 of the Mass Pike.

Major intersections

See also

References

102
Transportation in Berkshire County, Massachusetts